Mamaroneck Harbor is the name of a bay located in the village of Mamaroneck  on the Long Island Sound, in Westchester County, New York. It is open to southerly winds but affords shelter against northerly winds for vessels drawing less than 10. The depth in the outer harbor is from 7 to 12 feet at low tide. Mamaroneck River is a shallow, and a stream or tidal inlet. The rocks in Mamaroneck Harbor rise abruptly, and some of them are bare at low tide.

References

External links
 USGS - Geographic Names Information System - Mamaroneck Harbor
 NY Hometown Locator - Mamaroneck Harbor
 Mamaroneck Harbor - map

Bays of New York (state)
Mamaroneck, New York